The 2015–16 Iraq Division One. Al-Hussein ended as champions of the division for the first time in their history, and Al-Bahri were runners-up on the goals scored rule. Both teams were promoted to the 2016–17 Iraqi Premier League.

Format
League consists of four different stages. The first stage ended in April and the second stage ended in May; both of these rounds consisted of multiple group stages that were based on geographical position. 12 teams qualified for the Elite Stage. The Elite Stage started on June 6 and ended on June 14; it consisted of three groups of four, with the three group winners and the best runner-up reaching the Golden Stage (which starts on 13 July and ends on 19 July). The two top teams in the Golden Stage are promoted to the 2016–17 Iraqi Premier League and the top team is the Iraq Division One champion.

Elite stage

North & West Group

The match between Brayati and Ghaz Al-Shamal ended 1–1 but the result was later changed to a 3–0 win for Brayati after Ghaz Al-Shamal were found guilty of playing ineligible player Uday Shehab.

Baghdad Group

Middle Euphrates Group

Golden stage

Others
 2015–16 Iraqi Premier League
 2015–16 Iraq FA Cup

References

External links
 Iraq Football Association

Iraq Division One seasons
Division One